The 2019 Malaysia M3 League was the 1st season of the Malaysia M3 League that replaced the former Malaysia FAM League.

Establishment and format
This season saw a revamp of the competition's format by the Football Association of Malaysia (FAM). Announced earlier on 24 November 2018 by FAM deputy president Yusoff Mahadi, the format of the new season was outlined in a meeting by FAM's Local Competition Committee and were announced in a media statement on 19 December 2018.

The format will be reverted to a straight knock-out tournament format (a format used before 2008), as opposed to the league format used since 2008. 64 teams competed for the FAM Cup, including 6 teams confirmed earlier to participate in the Malaysia FAM Cup, and teams promoted to the 2019 Malaysia Premier League. The rest of the teams included were 19 teams nominated by FAM's associate members, and teams from the newly created Malaysia M4 League, whose selection was subject to methods decided by the Malaysian Football League. The champions of the 2019 Malaysia FAM Cup then competed with the last-placed 2019 Malaysia Premier League team in a play-off match for a slot to participate in the 2020 Malaysia Premier League.

Earlier, there was speculation that the league organization might be taken over by the Malaysian Football League, organizers of the Malaysia Super League and the Malaysia Premier League, having been held by the FAM since 1951, but this was clarified in an FAM media statement that the FAM will cooperate with the MFL for the organization of the tournament, with the FAM still holding major responsibilities and ownership of the tournament and the rights of it. MFL covered the cost of the teams participating from the first round up until the quarter-finals, while the FAM covered the cost of the teams participating from that point onwards.

Teams
As of 11 February 2019, 14 teams confirmed their participation in the 2019 Malaysia M3 League.

 Armed Forces
 Banggol Tokku
 Batu Dua
 DDM FC
 Langkawi Glory United
 Johor Bahru
 Kelantan United
 Kuching
 Penjara
 Protap
 Puchong Fuerza
 SAMB
 Tun Razak
 Ultimate

Season Changes

Renamed clubs 

 ATM FA was renamed to Armed Forces FC, and relocated to Kuala Lumpur.
 Glory United FC was renamed to Langkawi Glory United, and relocated to Langkawi.
 MPKB-BRI U-BeS was renamed to Kelantan United.

To the Malaysia M3 League
Promoted from the Malaysia M4 League
 Banggol Tok Ku - Promoted by winning the 2018 Terengganu Amateur M5 League 
 Batu Dua - Promoted by winning the 2018 South Selangor M5 League 
 Dak-dak Melawati - Promoted by winning the 2018 Selangor Social Premier M5 League
 Langkawi Glory United - Promoted by winning the 2018 Subang Football M5 League 
 Johor Bahru - Promoted by winning the 2018 Johor Darul Ta’zim M5 League (HM Sultan of Johor Cup)
 Penjara - Promoted by winning the 2018 PBNS President Cup M5 League
 Protap - Promoted by winning the 2018 Shah Alam M5 League
 Puchong Fuerza - Promoted by winning the 2018 Puchong Community M5 League 
 SAMB - Promoted by winning the 2018 Melaka Division 1 M5 League
 Ultimate - Promoted by winning the 2018 AXA Klang Valley M5 League

Relegated from the 2018 Malaysia Premier League
 None 2

New Team

 Tun Razak FC

From Malaysia FAM League
Promoted to the 2019 Malaysia Premier League
 Selangor United 1
 Perlis 2

Existing teams
 Armed Forces
 Kelantan United
 Kuching

Teams withdrawn
 Terengganu Hanelang
 Petaling Jaya Rangers 
 Marcerra United
 Kuala Lumpur City Hall
 Shahzan Muda 
 Ministry of Finance
 D'AR Wanderers 
 Terengganu City 2
 KL Cops 3 
 Tentera Darat 4 
 Uptown 3

Notes:

   Promoted by the finalist of the 2018 FAM Cup.

  Originally Terengganu II were relegated from 2018 Malaysia Premier League and Terengganu City F.C. were promoted by winning the 2018 Malaysia FAM Cup; however the Malaysian Football League blocked Terengganu City's promotion due to financial issues, granted Terengganu II's to stay in the Malaysia Premier League, and accepted Perlis FA's application to be promoted to the Malaysia Premier League, replacing the expelled Kuantan FA

   Originally KL Cops from the 2018 DD Social M5 League, and Uptown F.C. from the 2018 Sunarize Soccer M5 League were promoted to the 2019 Malaysia M3 League by winning their respective leagues; however the teams were not registered to the 2019 Malaysia M3 League due to unknown reasons.

 Tentera Darat FA from the 2018 Kuala Lumpur M5 Super League were not registered to the 2019 Malaysia M3 League due to being in the same division as their parent club, Armed Forces.

Clubs locations

<section end=map

Venues

Personnel and sponsoring

Coaching changes 
Note: Flags indicate national team as has been defined under FIFA eligibility rules. Players may hold more than one non-FIFA nationality.

Foreign players
The number of foreign players is restricted to two each team.

Note: Flags indicate national team as has been defined under FIFA eligibility rules. Players may hold more than one non-FIFA nationality.

 Players name in bold indicates that the player was registered during the mid-season transfer window.
  Foreign players who left their clubs or were de-registered from the playing squad due to medical issues or other matters.

Results

League table

Result table

Positions by round

Play-offs
The runner-up of the Malaysia M3 League will play a one-legged play-off against the last-placed Malaysia Premier League team to decide the second team to be promoted to the 2020 Malaysia Premier League.

Season statistics

Top scorers

Players sorted first by goals, then by last name.

Hat-tricks

Notes
4 Player scored 4 goals
5 Player scored 5 goals
(H) – Home team(A) – Away team

See also 
 2019 Malaysia Super League
 2019 Malaysia Premier League
 2019 Malaysia M4 League
 2019 Malaysia FA Cup
 2019 Malaysia Cup
 2019 Malaysia Challenge Cup
 2019 Piala Presiden
 2019 Piala Belia
 List of Malaysian football transfers 2019

References

External links
 Football Association of Malaysia website - FAM League

5
Malaysia M3 League seasons